Cathal J. Dodd (born 23 May 1956) is an Irish-Canadian voice actor and singer. He is best known for his portrayal of the Marvel Comics character Wolverine in X-Men: The Animated Series and the Marvel vs. Capcom series of video games. Cathal also provided the voice of the hero/villain Random Virus in the BBC series Ace Lightning. He recorded with producer Bob Hahn in Canada, which consisted of demos and material to be submitted to major labels. His recordings ended up on the RCA label, with a full-length album release New Horizons on Hahn's own Rising Records label in 1975. He co-hosted in the Canadian TV series Circus on CTV with Sherisse Laurence from 1978 to 1983.

Dodd's family moved from Ireland to Port Dover, Ontario. His mother was a music teacher at Port Dover Public School. He performed in a band in the 1970s called Deja Vu. He is also the older brother of rock vocalist Rory Dodd.

Discography 
 (1975) Cal Dodd – New Horizons
 (1976) Various Artists – Rockabye Hamlet
 (1976) Déjà Vu – Songs For Everyone
 (1977) Déjà Vu – Get It Up For Love
 (2007) Cal Dodd – Cal Dodd
 (2011) Tom Szczesniak – Waltz For Bill

Filmography

Film

Television

Video games

References

External links 
 
 

1956 births
Living people
Canadian male singers
Canadian male video game actors
Canadian male voice actors
Irish emigrants to Canada
Male actors from County Dublin